The Síol Muireadaigh or Síol Muireadhaigh (Anglicized as Sil Murray or Silmurray), was a leading sept of the Connachta group of Gaelic dynasties in medieval Ireland.  The name Síol Muireadaigh was also used to refer to the territory occupied by the group which was centered around the ancient royal site of Cruachan on the plains of Connacht (Mag nAí/Machaire Connacht) in County Roscommon.

Overview

A branch within the royal Uí Briúin (Uí Briúin Aí) dynasty, the tribe of Síol Muireadaigh was comprised of all the descendants of Muiredach Muillethan, a 7th-century King of Connacht. The term Síol denotes the seed, or descendants, of Muiredach.

The major division within the tribe was between the descendants of Muireadhach's two sons, Indrechtach mac Muiredaig and Cathal mac Muiredaig (a quo Clann Cathail), who would both go on to become Kings of Connacht.

Síol Muireadagh's parent dynasty, the Uí Briúin, held the Kingship of Connacht, with one exception, for over 700 years straight (696-1474). The vast majority of Uí Briúin kings were members of the Síol Muireadaigh, whose power reached its peak in the 12th century when Toirdhealbhach Mór Ua Conchobhair was recognized as High King of Ireland. Toirdhealbhach's son Ruaidri mac Tairrdelbach Ua Conchobair, would go on to succeed him, becoming last the Gaelic High King of Ireland.

Clann Cathail

The family groupings within Clann Cathail shown below are as listed in McFirbis' Leabhar na nGenealach (The Great Book of Irish Genealogies). Clann Cathail was ruled at various times by the O'Morans, O'Mulrenins, and the O'Flanagans, but the line of chiefs became permanent among the O'Flanagans by late medieval times. In addition to the family groupings below McFirbis lists 13 other surnames that he says also belonged to Clann Cathail: O'Mothlachain, O'Dathail, OhUllsa, O'Cloithfhilidh, O'Gusain, O'Fionnagain, O'Laighin, O'Laoghog, O'Tomhrair, O'Caomhoige, O'Breslein, O'Dubhain, and O'Fannain. He lists another sub-tribe in Clann Cathail called Siol Con Bhuidhe (a townland in Kilcorkey Parish called Ballyconboy was the land of that group). Other sources refer to O'Maolmordha (O'Moore) and O'Carthaig (O'Carthy) as being sub-chiefs of O'Flanagain.

The O'Flanagans had their main seat in Mantua (previously called Mointeach) which is located along the southern borders of Cloonyeffer and Corry East townlands in Shankill Parish. They also had another seat in the townland of Ballyroddy in Shankill Parish. They lost their territory to the O'Connor Roe in the 1300s.

Septs

Septs of the Síol Muireadaigh included

 Ó Conchubhair/O'Conor
 Mac Diarmada/MacDermot
 Ó Tighe/Tighe/MacTeige
 Ó Flannagain/O'Flanagan
 Ó Fithcheallaigh/O'Feely
 Ó Mannachan/O'Monahan
 Ó Maoilbhreanainn/O'Mulrennan/Brennan
 Ó Birn/O'Beirne
 Ó Concheanainn/Concannon
 Mag Oireachtaigh/MacGeraghty/Geraghty
 Mac Maghnusa/MacManus
 Ó Conbhuidhe/O’Conboy
 Ó Fionnachta/O’Finnerty/Finnerty

Family tree
    
     Muiredach Muillethan of the Connachta
     |
     |
     |                                                                           |
     |                                                                           |
  Indrechtaig, died 723.                                                      Cathal
     |                                                                           |
     |               |               
                                                |                                |
                                                |      |         |               |                  
                                                |                                |
                                                |      |         |               |                     
                                                |                                |
                                                |    Murgal    Medb              |                                                                
                                                |          = Áed Oirdnide        |               
                                                |                |               |
                                                |                |               |
                                                |                |               |
                                                |            Niall Caille        |
                                                |                |               |
                                                |                |               |
                                                |            Áed Findliath       |
                                                ||
                                                                 |
                                                                 |
                                                          Síol Muireadaigh

See also

 Kings of Connacht
 O'Conor Don
 MacDermot family
 MacDermot Roe
 Ollamh Síol Muireadaigh

References

External links
 http://www.rootsweb.ancestry.com/~irlkik/ihm/connacht.htm

Connachta
Gaelic-Irish nations and dynasties